The sharpsnout snake eel (Apterichtus klazingai) is an eel in the family Ophichthidae (worm/snake eels). It was described by Max Carl Wilhelm Weber in 1913. It is a marine, tropical eel which is known from the Indo-Western Pacific, including East Africa, the Marshall Islands, and the Hawaiian Islands.

The sharpsnout snake eel's diet consists of crabs, shrimp, and bony fish.

References

klazingai
Fish described in 1913